Mudhole Branch is a stream in Dubois County, Indiana, in the United States.

Mudhole Branch was named from the fact buffalo once wallowed in the mud here.

See also
List of rivers of Indiana

References

Rivers of Dubois County, Indiana
Rivers of Indiana